Eupolybothrus cavernicolus is a species of centipede so far only found in two caves near the village of Kistanje, in Šibenik-Knin County, Croatia.

It has been dubbed the cyber-centipede as it is the first eukaryotic species for which, in addition to the traditional morphological description, scientists have provided a transcriptomic profile, DNA barcoding data, detailed anatomical X-ray microtomography (micro-CT), and a movie of the living specimen.

It was discovered in by 2013 by biospeciesologists Komerički and Stoev.

References

Lithobiomorpha
Myriapods of Europe
Animals described in 2013
Cave arthropods
Endemic fauna of Croatia